|}

The Achilles Stakes is a Listed flat horse race in Great Britain open to horses aged three years or older.
It is run at Haydock Park over a distance of 5 furlongs (1,006 metres), and it is scheduled to take place each year in late May or early June.

The race was first run in 1995, at Kempton Park (the planned inaugural running in 1994 was abandoned).
The race was run at Goodwood in 2005 and 2006 before returning to Kempton Park which was by now an all-weather track.
The race was transferred to its current location in 2009.

Records

Most successful horse (2 wins):
 Boogie Street  – 2004, 2005

Leading jockey (3 wins):
 Richard Hughes – Boogie Street (2004), Boogie Street (2005), Dazed And Amazed (2007)

Leading trainer (4 wins):
 Richard Hannon Sr. – Brave Edge (1996), Boogie Street (2004), Boogie Street (2005), Dazed And Amazed (2007)

Winners

See also
 Horse racing in Great Britain
 List of British flat horse races

References
Racing Post

Flat races in Great Britain
Haydock Park Racecourse
Open sprint category horse races
1995 establishments in England
Recurring sporting events established in 1995